Peter Petersen (born 27 February 1981) is a South African association football defender who plays for Maritzburg United in the Premier Soccer League and South Africa.

External links
 

1981 births
South African soccer players
Living people
Sportspeople from Cape Town
Moroka Swallows F.C. players
Association football defenders
Cape Coloureds
South Africa international soccer players
Maritzburg United F.C. players
Hellenic F.C. players
2005 CONCACAF Gold Cup players
F.C. AK players